Abel Klein (born January 16, 1945) is a Brazilian-American mathematician, specializing in mathematical physics and, more specifically, random Schrödinger operators for disordered systems.

He received in 1971 his Doctor of Philosophy degree from the Massachusetts Institute of Technology under the supervision of Irving Segal with the thesis Regularity and Covariance Properties of Quantum Fields with Applications to Currents and Generalized Free Fields. Klein was from 1971 to 1972 an adjunct assistant professor at the University of California, Los Angeles, and from 1972 to 1974 an instructor at Princeton University. At the University of California, Irvine's mathematics department, he was from 1974 to 1977 an assistant professor and from 1977 to 1982 an associate professor, and he is from 1982 to the present a full professor; from 1996 to 1999 he was the chair of the department.

Klein is the author or coauthor of more than 120 articles. In 2012 he was elected a Fellow of the American Mathematical Society.

References

1945 births
Living people
20th-century American mathematicians
21st-century American mathematicians
Brazilian emigrants to the United States
Fellows of the American Mathematical Society
Massachusetts Institute of Technology alumni
Mathematical physicists
People from Rio de Janeiro (city)
Scientists from California
University of California, Irvine faculty